Madeleine Grace McGraw (born 22 December 2008) is an American actress. She is known for her role as Gwen in the 2021 horror film The Black Phone.

Career
After voicing in several Pixar and Marvel Studios films, Madeleine McGraw was cast in Scott Derrickson's The Black Phone as Gwen from Universal Pictures.

Personal life
She is the older sister of actress Violet McGraw.

Filmography

Film

Television

Awards and nominations

References

External links

 

Actresses from San Jose, California
American child actresses
American film actresses
American television actresses
Living people
2008 births